Maduk may refer to:

Miduk, a village in Iran
Maduk (musician) (born 1990), Dutch drum and bass producer/DJ